The Voice is the 2000 debut album by British tenor Russell Watson.

Track listing
 "Nella Fantasia" - Metro Voices, Royal Philharmonic Orchestra, Russell Watson  
 "Amor Ti Vieta" (from Fedora) - The London Session Orchestra, Russell Watson  
 "Pelagia's Song" (from Captain Corelli's Mandolin) - Russell Watson  
 "Caruso" - The London Session Orchestra, Russell Watson  
 "Miserere" - Royal Philharmonic Orchestra, Russell Watson  
 "Panis angelicus" - Royal Philharmonic Orchestra, Russell Watson  
 "Non ti scordar di me" - Royal Philharmonic Orchestra, Russell Watson  
 "La donna è mobile" (from "Rigoletto") - Royal Philharmonic Orchestra, Russell Watson  
 "Saylon Dola" - Máire Brennan, Royal Philharmonic Orchestra, Russell Watson  
 "Someone Like You" - Cleopatra Higgins, Royal Philharmonic Orchestra, Russell Watson  
 "Bridge over Troubled Water" - Royal Philharmonic Orchestra, Russell Watson  
 "Vienna" - Royal Philharmonic Orchestra, Russell Watson  
 "Funiculì, Funiculà" - Metro Voices, Royal Philharmonic Orchestra, Russell Watson  
 "Barcelona" - Metro Voices, Royal Philharmonic Orchestra, Shaun Ryder, Russell Watson  
 "Nessun Dorma!" (from Turandot) - Metro Voices, Royal Philharmonic Orchestra, Russell Watson

Charts

Weekly charts

Year-end charts

Certifications

References

Russell Watson albums
2000 debut albums
Classical crossover albums
Albums produced by Nick Patrick (record producer)